Kopperå Chapel is a parish church of the Church of Norway in Meråker municipality in Trøndelag county, Norway. It is located in the village of Kopperå. It is one of the three churches in the Meråker parish which is part of the Stjørdal prosti (deanery) in the Diocese of Nidaros. The white, stone church was built in a long church style in 1936 based upon designs by architect Roar Tønseth (1895-1985). The church seats about 150 people.

See also
List of churches in Nidaros

References

Meråker
Churches in Trøndelag
Long churches in Norway
Stone churches in Norway
20th-century Church of Norway church buildings
Churches completed in 1936
1936 establishments in Norway